Robert Michels (1876–1936), German sociologist.

Robert Michels may also refer to:

Robert Michels (physician) (born 1936), psychology researcher at Cornell and Columbia Universities

See also
Robert Michael (disambiguation)
Robert H. Michel (1923–2017), Illinois congressman and minority leader in the United States House of Representatives
Robert Michaels, musician